Silambarasan (born 3 February 1984) is an Indian actor, director, producer, music director, playback singer and lyricist working mainly for the South Indian film industry.

Discography

As a playback singer

As a lyricist

As composer

See also 
 Silambarasan filmography

References

Discographies of Indian artists
Lists of songs recorded by Indian singers